The 2021 New Zealand Women's National League was the first scheduled season of the new National League since its restructuring in 2021. It was the nineteenth scheduled season of national women's football and was planned as a hybrid season, with four teams from the Northern League representing the Northern Conference, Central Football and Capital Football representing the Central Conference, and Canterbury United Pride and Southern United representing the Southern Conference.

New Zealand Football announced on the 14 September that they had decided to terminate the remainder of the Northern League season and cancel any yet to be played fixtures due to Covid-19 and Auckland being in Level 4. The decision was made due to the fact that they couldn't complete all the games before Championship phase was due to begin.

On the 2 November, after confirmation that the alert levels would not change to allow the Auckland and Waikato teams to play any further part in the National Competition, New Zealand Football announced that they were cancelling the reminder of the National League. In its place, they instead decided on a one-off interregional competition, the National League: South Central Series.

Qualifying league

2021 Northern League

Teams

Northern League table

League completed early with two rounds remaining due to Covid-19 and Auckland being in Level 4.
There was no relegation with the league expanding to eight teams instead for 2022.

Northern League results table

Qualified teams

Championship phase

South Central Series

With confirmation that the alert levels were not changing to a level that would allow Auckland and Waikato teams to play in the National Competition, New Zealand Football announced that they were cancelling this seasons National League. In its place, they instead decided on a one-off interregional competition, the National League: South Central Series.

South Central table

South Central results table

South Central positions by round
The table lists the positions of teams after each week of matches. To preserve chronological evolvements, any postponed matches are not included in the round at which they were originally scheduled, but added to the full round they were played immediately afterwards. For example, if a match is scheduled for round 13, but then postponed and played between rounds 16 and 17, it is added to the standings for round 16.

Statistics

Top scorers

Hat-tricks

Own goals

References

External links
Official website 

2021
football
Women
Women
New Zealand, Women